The Triple Crown of Hurdling is awarded to a horse that wins all three of the open, two-mile Grade 1 Hurdling races in any given English National Hunt season:

The Fighting Fifth Hurdle, held at the Newcastle Racecourse
The Christmas Hurdle, held at Kempton Park Racecourse
The Champion Hurdle, held at Cheltenham Racecourse

From 2006 to 2010, the World Bet Exchange (WBX) put up a £1,000,000 bonus for any horse that wins the Triple Crown. WBX offered the prize, the richest in hurdling history. The bonus was split among the winning horse's connections as follows:
Owner: £700,000
Trainer: £150,000
Stable Lad: £100,000
Stable Staff: £50,000

The only horse to win all three races in one season was Kribensis, a grey Henbit gelding, trained by Sir Michael Stoute in 1989–90. Since the WBX bonus was introduced, only Punjabi and Go Native came close to claiming the prize, each winning two of the three races. After the bonus was withdrawn, their achievements were matched by My Tent Or Yours and Faugheen.

Punjabi (2008/09) 
Punjabi was the first horse who came closest of winning the WBX bonus. After narrowly beating the former champion hurdler Sublimity by a head in the 2008 Fighting Fifth Hurdle, Punjabi fell heavily in the 2008 Christmas Hurdle at the second-last flight while vying for the lead. Three months later, Punjabi held off the late rally of Celestial Halo to win the 2009 Smurfit Kappa Champion Hurdle as a 22/1 outsider.

His trainer, Nicky Henderson, was left to regret what might have been: "He was the forgotten horse. We'd have won a £1 million bonus if he hadn't fallen in the Christmas Hurdle at Kempton. He would have won I think. He was cantering. Anyway this makes up for it." Punjabi's owner, Raymond Tooth, later described Punjabi's fall at Kempton as, "...probably the most expensive fall in the history of racing."

Go Native (2009/10) 
Without his normal jockey Paul Carberry,  Go Native entered the 2009 Fighting Fifth Hurdle as a 25-1 long-shot.   Go Native and jockey Davy Condon went on to win the race by 2.5 lengths over Sublimity. Paul Carberry was quoted as saying: It wasn't a surprise to me. It looked tough on paper, but we know how good he is.

Go Native, owned by the Docado Syndicate, entered the Christmas Hurdle as the 5-2 second favourite (behind Binocular), and went on to secure a narrow victory over Starluck.

A win in the 2010 Cheltenham Festival for Go Native would have made him the first horse to win the WBX bonus. Over £205,000 was wagered on WBX for the 2009-10 Triple Crown to be won, the market was backed in from a high of 49/1 before the first leg to a low of 3.8/1 prior to the Champion Hurdle.  With jockey Paul Carberry set to ride Go Native, Meade said of his horse:  He's in great order and I couldn't be happier with him. It's all systems go. He looks great, he had a little breeze out on the track and he was nice and fresh. His last piece of work was pretty good all right, we were very happy with it.  Unfortunately, Go Native was unable to clear the second hurdle cleanly and could not recover, finishing the race in 10th place.

Triple Crown leg winners since the 1979/80 season

Note

Notes

See also
 Triple Crown of Thoroughbred Racing (United Kingdom)
 Horseracing in Great Britain

National Hunt hurdle races
 List of British National Hunt races